Joseph Denk Willis (April 9, 1890 – December 4, 1966) was a Major League Baseball pitcher. He played all or part of three seasons in the majors, from  until , for the St. Louis Browns and St. Louis Cardinals. Following his major league career, he continued to pitch in the minor leagues until 1920.

Sources

Major League Baseball pitchers
St. Louis Browns players
St. Louis Cardinals players
Springfield Senators players
Indianapolis Indians players
Columbus Senators players
Baseball players from Ohio
1890 births
1966 deaths